In the sociology of religion, Luc de Heusch coined the term adorcism for practices to placate or accommodate spiritual entities in a possessed person or place. Unlike exorcism, the relationship with the entities is potentially positive. This is sometimes used as initiation into a spirit cult.

Jean-Michel Oughourlian defines adorcism as "voluntary, desired, and curative possessions".

See also
 Drawing down the Goddess
 Exorcism
 Hausa animism

References

Exorcism
Sociology of religion